Robertson-Easterling-McLaurin House is a historic home located near Bennettsville, Marlboro County, South Carolina. It was built about 1790, and is a -story, timber frame I-house dwelling.  It has a brick pier foundation and exterior gable end chimneys.  It was the home of John Lowndes McLaurin (1860-1934), a former United States Congressman and Senator in the early-20th century.

It was listed on the National Register of Historic Places in 1984.

References

Houses completed in 1790
Houses on the National Register of Historic Places in South Carolina
National Register of Historic Places in Marlboro County, South Carolina
Houses in Marlboro County, South Carolina